Adriaan Reland (also known as Adriaen Reeland/Reelant, Hadrianus Relandus) (17 July 1676, De Rijp, North Holland5 February 1718, Utrecht) was a noted Dutch Orientalist scholar, cartographer and philologist. Even though he never left the Netherlands, he made significant contributions to Middle Eastern and Asian linguistics and cartography, including Persia, Japan and the Holy Lands.

Early life
Reland was the son of Johannes Reland, a Protestant minister, and Aagje Prins in the small North Holland village of De Rijp. Adriaan's brother, Peter (1678–1714), was an influential lawyer in Haarlem. Reland first studied Latin language in Amsterdam at age 11, and enrolled at University of Utrecht in 1693, at age 17, to study theology and philosophy. Initially interested in Hebrew and Syriac, he later began studying Arabic. In 1699, after obtaining his doctorate in Utrecht, Reland moved to Leiden and tutored the son of Hans Willem Bentinck, 1st Earl of Portland. The latter invited him to move to England, but Reland declined because of his father's deteriorating health.

Academic career
In 1699, Reland was appointed Professor of Physics and Metaphysics at the University of Harderwijk. By this point, he had achieved a good knowledge of Arabic, Hebrew, and other Semitic languages. In 1701, at age 25, he was appointed Professor of Oriental Languages at the University of Utrecht. Beginning in 1713, he also taught Hebrew Antiquities. This was extended with a Chair in Jewish Antiquity.

Reland gained renown for his research in Islamic studies and linguistics; his work being an early example of comparative linguistics. Additionally, he studied Persian and was interested in the relation of Eastern myths to the Old Testament. He published a work concerning East Asian myths, Dissertationum miscellanearum partes tres, in 1708. Moreover, he discovered the link for the Malay language to the Western Pacific dictionaries of Willem Schouten and Jacob Le Maire.

Research on Middle East
Reland, through compiling Arabic texts, completed De religione Mohammedica libri duo in 1705. This work, extended in 1717, was considered the first objective survey of Islamic beliefs and practices. It quickly became a reference work throughout Europe and was translated into Dutch, English, German, French and Spanish.

Reland also extensively researched Middle Eastern locations and biblical geography, taking interest in the Semitic peoples of Palestine. He published Antiquitates Sacrae veterum Hebraeorum (1708) and Palaestina ex monumentis veteribus illustrata (1714), in which he described and mapped the Biblical-era geography of Palestine.

Reland retained his professorship for his entire life, and additionally became a noted poet. In 1718, at age 41, he died of smallpox in Utrecht.

Selection of published works

 De religione Mohammedica libri duo – the first European attempt to systematically describe Islamic religious practices. Utrecht 1705, 1717
Dutch Translation Verhandeling van de godsdienst der Mahometaanen, als mede van het krygs-regt by haar ten tyde van oorlog tegens de christenen gebruykelyk. Utrecht 1718
 English translation: Of the Mahometan Religion, Two books. London 1712
German translation: Zwey Bücher von der Türkischen oder Mohammedischen Religion. Hannover 1716, 1717
 French translation: La Religion des Mahometans exposée par leurs propres Docteurs, avec des éclaircissemens sur les opinions qu'on leur a Faussement attribuées. The Hague 1721
 Palaestina ex monumentis veteribus illustrata – a detailed geographical survey of biblical Palestine, written in Latin. Published by Willem Broedelet. Utrecht 1714
 Dutch translation: Palestine opgeheldert, ofte they gelegentheyd van het Joodsche country.
 Analecta rabbinica. Utrecht 1702, 1723
 Dissertationum miscellanearum partes tres. Utrecht 1706–1708, 3 Teile
 Antiquitates sacrae veterum Hebraeorum. Utrecht 1708, 3. uppl. 1717, 1741
 De nummis veterum Hebraeorum. Utrecht 1709
 Brevis introductio ad grammaticam Hebraeam Altingianam. Utrecht 2. uppl. 1710, 1722
De natuurlijke wijsgeer – a Dutch translation of Ibn Tufail's Arabic novel Hayy ibn Yaqdhan. Printed by Pieter van der Veer. Amsterdam 1701
Galatea. Lusus poetica – a collection of Latin love-elegies, which brought Reland some fame as a Neolatin poet. Amsterdam 1701

Gallery

Bibliography
 Jaski, Bart, et al., editors. The Orient in Utrecht: Adriaan Reland (1676-1718), Arabist, Cartographer, Antiquarian and Scholar of Comparative Religion. Brill, 2021, http://www.jstor.org/stable/10.1163/j.ctv1v7zb8g. Accessed 15 May 2022.

References

External links

 Literature on Reland in Dutch Digital Library (DBNL)
 Maps by Reland 
 Complete bibliography on WorldCat
 Hadriani Relandi Analecta Rabbinica, 2-nd ed. 1723 on Google Books
 Hadriani Relandi Palaestina ex monumentis veteribus illustrata 1714 on Google Books
 The Heinsius-Collectie: Adriaan Reland, 1676–1718
Map of Palestine by Relnad, 1714 Eran Laor Cartographic Collection. The National Library of Israel

1676 births
1718 deaths
People from Graft-De Rijp
17th-century Latin-language writers
18th-century Latin-language writers
18th-century male writers
Christian Hebraists
Dutch cartographers
Linguists from the Netherlands
Dutch orientalists
Dutch male poets
New Latin-language poets
Academic staff of the University of Harderwijk
Cartographers of the Middle East
16th-century cartographers
17th-century cartographers
Historical geographers
Palestinologists